Manuel Álvarez-Beigbeder Pérez (born 21 February 1932), better known as Manuel Alejandro, is a Spanish composer of Latin love songs, which are better known as ballads. He has written, composed, and arranged songs for the likes of Luis Miguel, Plácido Domingo, Nino Bravo, Julio Iglesias, Raphael, Hernaldo Zúñiga, José José, José Luis Rodríguez, Emmanuel, Enrique Guzmán, Isabel Pantoja, Rocío Jurado, Rudy Marquez, and Jeanette, among many others.

Biography 
Manuel Alejandro was born in 1932 in Jerez de la Frontera–Cádiz. He is the son of one of Spain's most renowned contemporary symphonists, Germán Álvarez Beigbeder.  It was his father, an accomplished musician, professor, and composer, who inspired Manuel Alejandro to pursue music and become a composer.

Musical career

Hits of the 60s 
He started writing songs for Spanish singer Raphael during the 1960s. Many of those songs are now considered classics. The list includes such hits as:

 "Yo Soy Aquél"
 "Primavera en Otoño"
 "Desde Aquel Día"
 "Cuando Tu No Estas"
 "Cierro Mis Ojos"
 "Hablemos Del Amor"
 "Amor Mio"
 "Digan Lo Que Digan"
 "Estar Enamorado"
 "Como Yo Te Amo"

Hits of the 1970s and '80s 

He continued writing a few songs during the 1970s, but reached his peak in the early 1980s with the release of consecutive albums with songs performed by different international artists. A whole generation grew up listening to songs written by him, although not many knew he was the man behind those hits.

His repertoire of more than 500 songs includes:

 "Chabuca Limeña" by Raphael (tribute to Peruvian singer Chabuca Granda)
 "En Carne Viva", by Raphael
 "Que Sabe Nadie", by Raphael
 "Enamorado De La Vida", by Raphael
 "Provocación", by Raphael
 "Andando de tu Mano", by Enrique Guzmán & Hilda Aguirre
 "Lo Dudo", by José José
 "He Renunciado A Ti", by José José
 "Amar Y Querer", by José José
 "Lagrimas" by José José
 "Procuro Olvidarte", by Hernaldo Zúñiga
 "Insoportablemente Bella", by Emmanuel
 "Ven Con El Alma Desnuda", by Emmanuel
 "Este Amor Es Un Sueño De Locos", by José Luis Rodríguez "El Puma"
 "Dueño De Nada", by José Luis Rodríguez "El Puma"
 "Voy a Perder la Cabeza Por tu Amor", by José Luis Rodríguez "El Puma"
 "Todo Se Derrumbó", by Emmanuel
 "Quiero Dormir Cansado", by Emmanuel
 "Pobre Diablo", by Emmanuel
 "Soy Rebelde", by Jeanette & Iris Chacón
 "Corazón de poeta", by Jeanette
 "Frente a frente", by Jeanette
 "Ese Hombre", by Rocío Jurado
 "Señora", by Rocío Jurado
 "Lo Siento Mi Amor", by Rocío Jurado
 "Ayúdame A Pasar La Noche", by Angélica María
 "Manuela", by Julio Iglesias
 "Un Hombre Solo" by Julio Iglesias
 "Lo Mejor de Tu Vida" by Julio Iglesias

Hits of the 00s 

 "Al Que Me Siga", by Luis Miguel
 "Si Te Perdiera", by Luis Miguel
 "Si Tú Te Atreves", by Luis Miguel
 "Te Desean", by Luis Miguel

Personal life 
He has seven children: Javier, Carlos and Patricia with his first wife and Sandra, Beatriz, Marian and Viviana with his second wife.

References

External links
 «Manuel Alejandro Official Youtube Channel», Manuel Alejandro Official YouTube Channel.

Spanish composers
Spanish male composers
Eurovision Song Contest conductors
1933 births
Living people
People from Jerez de la Frontera
Musicians from Andalusia
Latin music songwriters
21st-century conductors (music)
21st-century male musicians